Alice Masaryková or Alice Garrigue Masaryk (3 May 1879 – 29 November 1966) was a Czech teacher, sociologist and politician. She is a prominent figure within the field of applied sociology and known to many as the daughter of Tomáš Garrigue Masaryk and the First Lady of Czechoslovakia.

Family
Alice Masaryk was born in Vienna, Austria as the first child to the future founder and first president of Czechoslovakia, Tomáš Garrigue Masaryk and his US American wife Charlotte Garrigue. Her siblings were Herbert Masaryk, Olga Masaryková, Eleanor Masaryková and Jan Masaryk. In her memoirs Masaryk recalls a "happy and fulfilled childhood...[and] dedicated herself mainly to the study of languages, religion and especially reading."

Education
The family moved to Prague when she was 3 years old, where Masaryk started school in 1886. Her education lasted until 1898 and included advanced secondary education at the first girls' grammar school in Prague, Minerva. This was followed up by university studies at the renowned Charles University in Prague to fulfill her dream of becoming a doctor. Masaryk reports that she took the opportunity very seriously not least because she was one of few women admitted for medical sciences. However she left the department after a year for several reasons. She continued her studies in diverse subjects such as History, Sociology and Philosophy at the Charles University and moved to London, Berlin (1901-1902) and Leipzig to "deepen her academic education by studying abroad." She received a Doctorate on 23 June 1903, with a dissertation on "The Magna Charta of Freedom of King John Lackland, 1215".

Work
After she finished her studies, Masaryk was invited to stay at the University of Chicago Social Settlement (UCSS) where she met Julia Lathrop, Mary McDowell and Jane Addams. This encounter and the time spent in the USA "influenced her future professional development...[by] learn[ing] the progressive American methods of social work". 

After returning to Czechoslovakia she worked as a teacher in České Budějovice from 1907 to 1910, where she taught Geography and History at a secondary educational level. In 1910 she returned to Prague to teach at a new school.

Masaryk was one of the founders of the sociological department at the Charles University in Prague in 1911, which focused on social pathologies including topics like: "reality of poverty, the working and living conditions of the industrial workers of Prague, neglected children and the family, alcoholism, venereal disease, nutrition, and social hygiene." Masaryk's colleague, Anna Berkovcova reports Masaryk's credo:  After being detained in 1915, Alice Masaryk was arrested  and was not then allowed to return to her job as a teacher and with the closure of the sociological departement she began teaching sociology from her home only until in 1918 she established of the first Czechoslovak Higher School of Social Work in collaboration with her friend Anna Berkovcova. Anna Berkovcova describes the reasoning for the founding of the school as follows: The school was established with the authority of the Bohemian Commission for Child Care and was at the time "the only Bohemian welfare organization recognized by the Austro-Hungarian government." Masaryk and Berkovcova are both recognised as the founders of social education in Czechoslovakia. The objective of the school was shaped by the "sociology developed by Jane Addams and George Herbert Mead at the University of Chicago...and the UCSS."

After the establishment of the Czechoslovak Republic Masaryk was appointed as the head of the Czechoslovak Red Cross organisation on 6 February 1919, and she presided this organisation gratuitously until the German invasion in 1938. This position enabled her to change the Austrian welfare system, for example by establishing policlinics and food kitchens for the poor. In 1929 she appointed structural engineer and architect Marie Schneiderová-Zubaníková as a technical adviser. 

Following the German invasion of Czechoslovakia in 1938, Masaryk took up on an invitation to stay at the UCSS. A lecture tour on the social condition of Czechoslovakia, where she replaced her brother, was cancelled after 5 months. Several traumatic incidents led to her hospitalisation from 1940 to 1945. She returned to Czechoslovakia after the end of World War II only to have to emigrate again when the Soviet Union seized power. She permanently stayed in the US and continued to be politically active for the Czechoslovak cause.

Politics
Alice Masaryk's involvement in Czechoslovak politics was overshadowed by her father's role in the creation of an independent Czechoslovak state. In 1915 Masaryk was accused of hiding her father's political writings and detained for eight months in a prison in Vienna. Consideration of her execution was only quieted after the USA put pressure on the Austrian government. The interfering was based on a public uproar in the U.S., in which Masaryk was openly supported by prominent personalities like Julia Lathrop, Jane Addams and Mary McDowell. In 1919 Alice Masaryk was one of the first women elected as members of parliament of the Czechoslovak Republic founded on 28 October 1918, and headed by her father Tomáš Garrigue Masaryk as the first president. When her mother died in 1923, Masaryk replaced her as the official representative alongside her father and was essentially the First Lady of the new Republic.
In 1928 Masaryk was the president of the First International Conference of Social Work and at a consequent meeting in 1939 clearly outlined her political attitude when {{quote|she spoke of the need for each country to pursue 'liberty, equality, and fraternity' as a means of producing a democratic unity of all people...she stressed that a democracy truly concerned about the welfare of all people would be economically stabler and politically more humane."}}
Masaryk was an active supporter of the academic women network and it is also recorded that Thomas Masaryk contributed to a monetary fund for the First International Fellowship of the International Federation of University Women (IFUW).

The German occupation forced Masaryk into exile. She continued to be politically active during her stay in the U.S. by dedicating herself to charitable activities. With the German attack on Poland on 1 September 1939 Masaryk "openly joined the campaign for the liberation of Czechoslovakia."

With the end of World War II, Masaryk returned from the USA only to witness the take over of the Soviet Union in 1948. When her brother, Jan Garrigue Masaryk, the Foreign Minister of Czechoslovakia was found dead in March 1948, Alice Masaryk was forced to emigrate and she found a permanent refuge in the USA. She carried on her political work and from 1950 to 1954 "frequently spoke on the Radio Free Europe, encouraging those remaining in Czechoslovakia to remain steadfast in their struggle for democracy."

Death

Alice Masaryková died on 29 November 1966 in Chicago. In 1994, her ashes were buried next to her parents in a plot at Lány cemetery, where also her brother Jan Masaryk was laid to rest.

Publications
Alice Masaryk, The Bohemian in Chicago, in: Charities and the Commons (1904), 13, p. 206-210.
Alice Masaryk, foreword, in Mary E. Hurlbutt (ed.) (1920a) Social Survey of Prague, Vol 3, Prague: Ministry of Welfare, pp. 7–8.
Alice Masaryk, From an Austrian Prison, in: The Antlantic Monthly (1920b), 126, pp. 577–587.
Alice Masaryk, The Prison House, in The Atlantic Monthly (1920c), 126, pp. 770–779.
Alice Masaryk, A Message from Alice Masaryk, in: The Survey (1921a), 46, p. 333.
Alice Masaryk, The Program of the Czechoslovak Red Cross after 18 months, in: Revue Internationale de la Croix-Rouge (1921b), pp. 736–739.
Alice Masaryk, Help for Russia, in: Revue Internationale de la Croix-Rouge'' (1921c), pp. 863–864.
Alice Masaryk, The Bond Between Us, in Proceedings of the National Conference of Social Work (1939), New York, Columbia University Press, pp. 69–74.

References

Bibliography
Alice Garrigue Masaryk, 1879–1966. Her Life as Recorded in Her Own Words and by Her Friends (1980).
Bruce Keith, Alice Masaryk (1879-1966), in Mary Jo Deegan (ed.), Women in Sociology, New York 1991, p. 298-305.
Christine von Oertzen, Strategie Verständigung - Zur transnationalen Vernetzung von Akademikerinnen 1917-1955 (to be published in 10/2012).
H. Gordon Skilling, Mother and Daughter. Charlotte and Alice Masaryk. Prague: Gender Studies, 2001.

1879 births
1966 deaths
Writers from Prague
Members of the Revolutionary National Assembly of Czechoslovakia
Czech feminists
Czech people of American descent
Czech people of French descent
Czechoslovak expatriates in Austria
Czechoslovak expatriates in the United States
Czech schoolteachers
Charles University
Czech sociologists
Politicians from Prague